Casalinhos de Alfaiata is a hamlet in the parish of Silveira, in the municipality of Torres Vedras, Portugal. 

Joaquim Agostinho (1943-1984), a Portuguese professional bicycle racer, lived in Casalinhos de Alfaiata for several years. 

Populated places in Lisbon District